Daren Weston Bates (born November 27, 1990) is an American football linebacker who is a free agent. He played college football for Auburn and was signed by the Los Angeles Rams as an undrafted free agent in 2013. He has also played for the Oakland Raiders, Houston Texans, and Tennessee Titans.

High school career
Bates played his freshman through junior year at Christian Brothers High School in Memphis, Tennessee. While there, Bates was a 2-time first-team Tennessee All-State safety. His senior year, Bates played at Olive Branch High School in Mississippi for coach Scott Samsel. He collected 90 tackles and four interceptions and had nearly 900 yards of total offense as a senior and was named MHSAA All-Region 1 Class 5A team.

College career
In 2009, Bates was tied for 39th in the SEC in tackles per game, with 5.4.  In 2009, he started all 13 games at safety and totaled 70 tackles with 2.5 tackles for loss and one fumble recovery. In 2010, he appeared in 12 games with nine starts and was 8th on team with 48 tackles. Bates was made the Freshman All SEC team and also was a second-team Freshman All American. Bates made his first collegiate start at linebacker in the season opener vs. Arkansas State after playing safety the previous years.  In 2011 Bates started all 13 games and led the team with 104 tackles and was third on team with 8.5 tackles for loss (-30), 2.5 quarterback sacks (-15), and nine quarterback hurries. In 2012 Bates made 94 tackles (39) solo and 5.5 for losses he also batted away 4 passes and recovered 2 fumbles and intercepted a pass.

Professional career

St. Louis Rams
Bates was signed by the St. Louis Rams as an undrafted free agent and made the final 53-man squad on September 1, 2013. He has been used primarily as a special teams player for the Rams providing a valuable contribution. On October 13, 2013 against the Houston Texans, Bates returned a fumbled kickoff return for a touchdown to score the first touchdown of his career.

In a December 21, 2014 game against the New York Giants, Bates leaped over the Giants' long snapper during a field goal attempt and blocked the kick, which was recovered by Will Herring for the Rams.

On September 11, 2015, Bates was named one of the five captains for the 2015 season for the Rams, the first time in his career.

Bates registered back-to-back seasons (2014-2015) of double-digit special team's tackles.

Oakland Raiders

Bates signed with the Oakland Raiders on March 14, 2016.

Tennessee Titans
On March 10, 2017, Bates signed a three-year, $6 million contract with the Tennessee Titans. In 2017, Bates set a career high and ranked second on the team with 16 special teams' tackles.

On September 3, 2018, Bates was announced to be the special teams captain and tallied 10 special teams' tackles.

Houston Texans
After becoming a free agent in March 2020, Bates had a tryout with the Houston Texans on August 20, 2020. He signed with the team three days later. He was waived on August 31, 2020.

Tennessee Titans (second stint)
On September 14, 2020, Bates was signed to the Tennessee Titans' practice squad. He was elevated to the active roster on October 13 and October 17 for the team's weeks 5, 6, and 7 games against the Buffalo Bills, Houston Texans, and Pittsburgh Steelers, and reverted to the practice squad after each game. He was promoted to the active roster on October 27, 2020.

Atlanta Falcons
On October 18, 2021, Bates was signed to the Atlanta Falcons practice squad. He was promoted to the active roster on November 2, 2021. He was placed on injured reserve on November 18. He was activated on December 25.

References

External links
Auburn Tigers bio
Tennessee Titans bio

1990 births
Living people
American football linebackers
African-American players of American football
St. Louis Rams players
Oakland Raiders players
Tennessee Titans players
Auburn Tigers football players
Players of American football from Memphis, Tennessee
Houston Texans players
Atlanta Falcons players
21st-century African-American sportspeople